Snævar Sölvi Sölvason (born 26 July 1985) is an Icelandic film director and screenwriter. Since 2011 he has directed three films, including the 2019 drama Eden.

Biography
Snævar was raised in Bolungarvík, Iceland. He studied Financial engineering at Háskóli Íslands, where he graduated in 2010. Shortly later he wrote and directed the feature film Slay Masters which was based on his own experience from the Icelandic fishing industry. In 2012, Snævar abandoned his career in the financial industry and joined The Icelandic Film School. In 2013 he wrote and directed the comedy Albatross, starring Hansel Eagle and Pálmi Gestsson, which premiered in 2015. In 2019, he wrote and directed the drama Eden.

Filmography
 Slay Masters (2011)
 Albatross (2015)
 Eden (2019)

References

External links

1985 births
Living people
Snaevar Solvi Solvason
Snaevar Solvi Solvason